Play Date is the second studio album of saxophonist Euge Groove issued in July 2002 by Warner Bros. Records. The album rose to No. 10 on the Billboard Contemporary Jazz Albums chart and No. 13 on the Billboard Jazz Albums chart.

Tracklisting

References

2002 albums
Jazz albums by American artists
Warner Records albums